Krasivy is a rural locality (a settlement) in Soldatsky Selsoviet Rural Settlement, Fatezhsky District, Kursk Oblast, Russia. Population:

Geography 
The settlement is located on the Zhuravchik River (a right tributary of the Ruda in the basin of the Svapa), 96 km from the Russia–Ukraine border, 41 km north-west of Kursk, 9 km south-west of the district center – the town Fatezh, 7.5 km from the selsoviet center – Soldatskoye.

 Climate
Krasivy has a warm-summer humid continental climate (Dfb in the Köppen climate classification).

Transport 
Krasivy is located 7.5 km from the federal route  Crimea Highway as part of the European route E105, 10 km from the road of regional importance  (Fatezh – Dmitriyev), 0.5 km from the road of intermunicipal significance  (Alisovo-Pokrovskoye – Kofanovka), 34 km from the nearest railway halt 29 km (railway line Arbuzovo – Luzhki-Orlovskiye).

The rural locality is situated 45 km from Kursk Vostochny Airport, 160 km from Belgorod International Airport and 238 km from Voronezh Peter the Great Airport.

References

Notes

Sources

Rural localities in Fatezhsky District